Lihuaxuella thermophila  is a bacterium from the genus of Lihuaxuella which has been isolated from geothermal soil from the Rehai National Park in Tengchong in China.

References

External links
Type strain of Lihuaxuella thermophila at BacDive -  the Bacterial Diversity Metadatabase	

Bacillales
Bacteria described in 2013